WCAY-CD, UHF digital channel 36, is a low-powered, Class A television station licensed to Key West, Florida, United States. The station is owned by Beach TV Properties.

History
W34AD was granted a construction permit for operation on analog channel 34 on March 19, 1985, and filed for a license to cover in December 1986. In 1994, it became WCAY-LP. In 2009, it became a Class A station on channel 36, modifying its call letters to WCAY-CA, and it converted to digital broadcasts in 2011, becoming WCAY-CD.

Prior to its current affiliation, it was part of the Almavision network.

External links

Television channels and stations established in 1985
CAY-CD
Low-power television stations in the United States
1985 establishments in Florida